This is a list of adult fiction books that topped The New York Times Fiction Best Seller list in 1941. When the list began in 1931 through 1941 it only reflected sales in the New York City area.

The two most popular books that year were The Keys of the Kingdom, by A. J. Cronin, which held on top of the list for 16 weeks, and This Above All by Eric Knight, which was on top of the list for 15 weeks.

See also

 1941 in literature
 Lists of The New York Times Fiction Best Sellers
 Publishers Weekly list of bestselling novels in the United States in the 1940s

References

1941
.
1941 in the United States